Phobos 1 was an uncrewed Soviet space probe of the Phobos Program launched from the Baikonour launch facility on 7 July 1988. Its intended mission was to explore Mars and its moons Phobos and Deimos. The mission failed on 2 September 1988 when a computer malfunction caused the end-of-mission order to be transmitted to the spacecraft. At the time of launch it was the heaviest interplanetary spacecraft ever launched, weighing .

Background

The intent to carry out a mission with Phobos as the target was first made public 14 November 1984. Phobos was chosen as the target in order to avoid directly competing with previous American missions. Originally a 1986 launch was planned but this later moved to 1988.

Flight plan 
It was to take an estimated 200 days for the Phobos 1 space probe to travel from the Earth to Mars. Two mid-course corrections were planned. The first between days 7 and 20, and the second between day 185 and 193. These corrections would place the probe in a highly elliptical orbit around Mars. Next, it was to move into an almost circular observation orbit at 350 km. After achieving observation orbit the lower stage of the propulsion system would be dropped. The probe would then rendezvous with Phobos, drop a lander containing scientific equipment from an altitude of 50 meters, and move into a final equatorial orbit above Mars where it would study the martian surface and atmosphere.

Mission objectives 
The Phobos 1 probe's scientific study was separated into three phases. In stage one the probe would investigate the Sun and interplanetary space while traveling from the Earth to Mars. In stage two the probe would study Mars and Phobos while in orbit around Mars. During the final stage it would approach to within 50 meters of the Phobos surface while conducting several experiments.

Experiments 
The Phobos probe carried several scientific experiments. It carried a radar transmitter, X-ray and alpha-backscatter spectrometers, camera, and a laser that could vaporize tiny spots so a reflector could analyze the vapor for atomic masses.

The hopper would be dropped onto Phobos to drill and analyze the soil. It would be able to bounce across the terrain by using spring loaded legs.

Mission profile

The optical coronagraph that was part of the Terek experiment and  designed to observe the Sun was non-functional from launch.

Malfunction 
On 2 September 1988, the expected transmission from Phobos 1 was not received. This was traced to a faulty key-command that was sent on 28 August from ground control in Yevpatoria. A technician unintentionally left out a single hyphen in one of the keyed commands. All commands were supposed to be proofread by a computer before being transmitted, but the computer that checked code was malfunctioning. The technician violated procedure and transmitted the command before the computer could be fixed to proofread it. This minor alteration in code deactivated the attitude thrusters. By losing its lock on the Sun, the spacecraft could no longer properly orient its solar arrays, thus depleting its batteries.

Software instructions to turn off the probe's attitude control, normally a fatal operation, were part of a routine used when testing the spacecraft on the ground.  Normally this routine would be removed before launch.  However, the software was coded in PROMs, and so removing the test code would have required removing and replacing the entire computer.  Because of time pressure from the impending launch, engineers decided to leave the command sequence in, though it should never be used.  However, a single-character error in constructing an upload sequence resulted in the command executing, with subsequent loss of the spacecraft.

The error is also attributed to a political argument between Yevpatoria and Moscow over who should control the mission. Moscow won control responsibility, but Yevpatoria would be responsible for checking all transmitted commands. This further complicated the process of transmitting valid commands to the spacecraft.

Subsequent investigation 
After the incident at Yevpatoria, an investigation was immediately ordered to determine who was responsible for the failure. Nevertheless, disciplinary action was postponed until the completion of the Phobos 2 mission. This was to prevent the demoralization of the Phobos 2 team. Any penalization of the Phobos 1 team would create anxiety among the Phobos 2 team and reduce the chances of mission success. This postponement of punitive measures was urged by IKI director Roald Sagdeev. He quoted the former secret-service chief under Stalin, Lavrenti Beria, who said, "Let's make them work for now. We can shoot them all later." The investigation concluded with the dismissal of the ground control commander at Yevpatoria and the acknowledgement that the computer system was poorly designed.

Results
The probe observed the sun in both x-rays (0.5–2.5 nm) and Extreme ultraviolet (17–18 nm). On 27 August a solar flare was observed.

Legacy 
Phobos 1 failed before it could achieve its main scientific objectives, and while the Phobos program as a whole can be considered a failure, the probes discovered previously unknown information concerning Mars and Phobos during their lengthy orbital flights. In 1988, less was known about Mars and its satellites than the more distant gas giants.

See also

 List of software bugs

References 

Missions to Mars
1988 in the Soviet Union
Soviet Mars missions
Derelict satellites in heliocentric orbit
Non Earth orbiting satellites of the Soviet Union
Phobos (moon)
Spacecraft launched in 1988